Thomas Hugh O'Halloran (24 December 1904 – 31 March 1956) was an Australian rules footballer who played in the VFL between 1925 and 1934 for the Richmond Football Club. He served as Richmond's Reserves Coach in 1935 and as the club's vice president in 1936 and 1940.

See also
 1927 Melbourne Carnival

Footnotes

References 
 Hogan P: The Tigers Of Old, Richmond FC, Melbourne 1996
 Richmond Football Club – Hall of Fame inductee: Tom O’Halloran

External links
 
 
 Thomas O'Halloran's playing statistics from The VFA Project

1904 births
1956 deaths
VFL/AFL players born outside Australia
Richmond Football Club players
Camberwell Football Club players
Richmond Football Club Premiership players
Australian rules footballers from Victoria (Australia)
New Zealand players of Australian rules football
New Zealand emigrants to Australia
Two-time VFL/AFL Premiership players